Michael Delaune   was an Anglican priest in the  17th century.

Delaune was born in London and educated at Trinity College, Dublin.  He was Archdeacon of Dublin from 1672 until 1675.

Notes 

English people of French descent
Clergy from London
17th-century Irish Anglican priests
Alumni of Trinity College Dublin
Archdeacons of Dublin